Clément Armand Fallières (6 November 1841 – 22 June 1931) was a French statesman who was President of France from 1906 to 1913.

Early life 
He was born at Mézin in the département of Lot-et-Garonne, France, where his father was clerk of the peace. He studied law and became an advocate at Nérac, beginning his public career there as municipal councilor (1868), afterwards mayor (1871), and as councillor-general of the department of Lot-et-Garonne (1871). Being an ardent Republican, he lost this position in May 1873 upon the fall of Thiers, but in February 1876 was elected deputy for Nérac. In the Chamber he sat with the Opportunist Republican parliamentary group, Gauche républicaine, signed the protestation of 18 May 1877, and was re-elected five months later.

In 1880 he became under-secretary of state in the department of the interior in Jules Ferry's ministry (May 1880 to November 1881). From 7 August 1882 to 20 February 1883 he was Minister of the Interior, and for a month (from 29 January 1883) was Prime Minister. His ministry had to face the question of the expulsion of the pretenders to the throne of France, owing to the proclamation by Prince Napoléon (January 1883).

Political career 
Fallières, who was ill at the time, was not able to face the storm of opposition, and resigned when the Senate rejected his project. The following November, however, he was chosen as minister of public instruction by Jules Ferry, and carried out various reforms in the school system.

He resigned in March 1885, becoming Minister of the Interior in Maurice Rouvier's cabinet two years later. He exchanged his portfolio in December for that of the department of justice. He returned again to the Ministry of the Interior in February 1889, and finally retook the department of justice from March 1890 to February 1892. In June 1890 his département (Lot-et-Garonne) elected him to the senate by 417 votes to 23. There Fallières remained independent of party struggles, although maintaining his influence among the Republicans.

In March 1899 he was elected President of the Senate, and retained that position until January 1906, when he was chosen by a union of the groups of the Left in both chambers as candidate for the Presidency of the Republic. He was elected on the first ballot by 449 votes against 371 for his opponent, Paul Doumer.

Fallières was an outspoken opponent of the death penalty and commuted the sentences of many prisoners sentenced to death.

Fallières' ministry, 29 January 1883 – 21 February 1883
Armand Fallières – President of the Council of Ministers, interim Minister of Foreign Affairs, Minister of the Interior, and Minister of Worship
Jean Thibaudin – Minister of War
Pierre Tirard – Minister of Finance
Paul Devès – Minister of Justice
François de Mahy – Minister of Agriculture and interim Minister of Marine and Colonies
Jules Duvaux – Minister of Public Instruction and Fine Arts
Anne Charles Hérisson – Minister of Public Works
Adolphe Cochery – Minister of Posts and Telegraphs
Pierre Legrand – Minister of Commerce

Orders and decorations
 : Grand Cross of the Royal and Distinguished Order of Charles III, with Collar, 19 June 1905
 : Knight of the Royal Order of the Seraphim, 27 April 1906
 : Grand Cross of the Royal Norwegian Order of Saint Olav, with Collar, 13 October 1906
  Siam: Knight of the Order of the Royal House of Chakri, 20 June 1907
 : Collar of the Order of Carol I, 1907
 : Royal Victorian Chain, 29 May 1908
 : Knight of the Supreme Order of the Most Holy Annunciation, 25 April 1909
 : Grand Cross of the Order of Saint-Charles, 27 April 1909

References

External links
 

1841 births
1931 deaths
20th-century presidents of France
20th-century Princes of Andorra
People from Lot-et-Garonne
Opportunist Republicans
Democratic Republican Alliance politicians
Prime Ministers of France
French interior ministers
Members of the 1st Chamber of Deputies of the French Third Republic
Members of the 2nd Chamber of Deputies of the French Third Republic
Members of the 3rd Chamber of Deputies of the French Third Republic
Members of the 4th Chamber of Deputies of the French Third Republic
Members of the 5th Chamber of Deputies of the French Third Republic
Senators of Lot-et-Garonne
French Senators of the Third Republic
Mayors of places in Nouvelle-Aquitaine
Grand Crosses of the Order of Saint-Charles